The Judo competition of the 2012 Summer Paralympics was held in ExCeL London from 30 August to 1 September. There were 13 events, corresponded to seven weight classes for men and six for women. At the Paralympics, judo was contested by visually impaired athletes.

Participating nations
128 judokas from 30 nations competed.

Medal summary

Medal table

Medals

Men's events

Women's events

See also
Judo at the 2012 Summer Olympics

References

External links
 

 
2012
2012 Summer Paralympics events
Paralympics
Judo competitions in the United Kingdom